Samuele Ricci (born 21 August 2001) is an Italian professional footballer who plays as midfielder for Serie A club Torino and the Italy national team.

Club career

Empoli
Ricci came through the Empoli youth teams and started playing for their under-19 squad in the 2018–19 season. He was called up to the senior squad for the first time in April 2019, but remained on the bench on that occasion. He made his professional debut for Empoli on 21 September 2019, at the age of 18, replacing Leo Štulac in a 1–0 win against Cittadella. On 3 December, he made his debut in the Coppa Italia, in the 4th round round lost 1–0 against Cremonese. Having become a starter, he ended the season with 30 total appearances.

The following season, the coach Alessio Dionisi mainly used him as a mezzala. On 18 January 2021, he scored his first goal as a professional in the 5–0 victory against Salernitana. Empoli finished the season in first place in the league standing and were promoted to Serie A, with Ricci winning the Manlio Scopigno award as the best player of the season.

On 21 August 2021, on his 20th birthday, Ricci made his Serie A debut in the 3–1 home loss against Lazio. The following 26 September, he scored his first goal in Serie A, in the match won 4–2 against Bologna.

Torino
On 30 January 2022, Ricci was loaned to Torino with a conditional obligation to purchase. He made his debut for Torino under Ivan Juric on 27 February of that same year in a 1–2 defeat against Cagliari. He finished the season with 12 appearances for Torino and was purchased outright by the club.

On 28 January 2023 he scored his first goal for Torino, in a 2–2 draw away against former club Empoli.

International career
He was first called-up to represent his country in December 2017 for an Under-17 squad friendly against France.

He was included in the 2018 UEFA European Under-17 Championship squad and played in five out of six games, including 4 as a starter. He started the final game and scored Italy's first goal in a 2–2 draw, but was substituted before Italy lost to Netherlands in a penalty shoot-out and finished as runners-up.

At the 2019 UEFA European Under-19 Championship, he started all three games as Italy was eliminated at group stage.

On 13 October 2020 he made his debut with the Italy U21 playing as a starter in a qualifying match won 2–0 against Republic of Ireland in Pisa.

He was selected in the senior Italy squad for the 2022 Finalissima against Argentina on 1 June 2022 and for 2022–23 UEFA Nations League group stage matches against Germany, Hungary, England and Germany between 4 and 14 June 2022.

Style of play

Ricci is a right-footed player, mainly deployed as playmaker in front of the defence or as a midfielder. Gifted with excellent individual technique and sense of positioning, he is regarded as one of the most important prospects in Italian football. His reference model is Andrea Pirlo.

Personal life 
On 9 September 2020, he tested positive for COVID-19.

Career statistics

Club

Honours
Empoli
Serie B: 2020–21

Individual
Serie B Footballer of the Year: 2020–21

References

External links
 

Living people
2001 births
People from Pontedera
Sportspeople from the Province of Pisa
Italian footballers
Association football midfielders
Italy international footballers
Italy under-21 international footballers
Italy youth international footballers
Empoli F.C. players
Torino F.C. players
Serie A players
Serie B players
Footballers from Tuscany